The 1st Trampoline World Championships were held in Royal Albert Hall, London, England on 21 March 1964.  The competition was on knock out basis, with 10 jumps each in a routine and 5–7 judges involved in the judging.  The competition attracted twelve countries from around the globe.

Results

Men's trampoline

Women's trampoline

References
 Trampoline UK
 Sports123 

Trampoline World Championships
Trampoline Gymnastics World Championships
Trampoline World Championships
Trampoline World Championships
Trampoline World Championships
Trampoline World Championships
Trampoline World Championships